Khổng Tú Quỳnh (born November 22, 1991, in Ho Chi Minh City) is a Vietnamese singer known for pop genre songs like "Tiệm Bánh Dâu Tây" (Strawberry Shortcake Shop) and "Lạnh" (Cold). She is also an advertising model in teen magazines and on television and has acted in several movies.

Career
She used to be teen model, though she had never appeared on big stages. Her manager, Thao Minh Chau, discovered her as she was hosting at a show. After signing a contract with NewGen Entertainment, she appeared in front of audiences of 5,000 performing the song "Tiệm Bánh Dâu Tây" which instantly impressed them. Ever since, she was named Cô Bé Dâu Tây (Strawberry Girl). She became more well known with songs like "Nhớ Lắm" and "Lạnh". Later being called the "Idol of 9x Generation", she was chosen as a face of many brands such as the online game Chiến Quốc, Fresh Perfume, Gummy. She also owned a clothing shop named Kira.

In August 2009, her first album, Dâu Tây's Story, was released as gift for anyone who had supported her, with a short film attached. In September 2009, she released online album. Try To Up. which was her first experience of the underground music genre. She also filmed a music video attached in the album. After this album, her style became grown up compared to her old style.

At the end of 2009, she starred in Công Chúa Teen va Ngũ Hổ Tướng with Hoai Linh.

In 2010, she collaborated with Tim for the song "Không Giới Hạn" (Limitless) which charted on many music charts. She also appeared in two of Tim's music videos. After the project, she appeared as the painter Kỳ Duyên in the TV drama, Màu Của Tình Yêu (Color of Love). In June, she released the song "Vội Vàng" (Rush) and performed it in the final night of Miss Vietnam Pageant in Europe. Besides performing, she also had the music video filmed in UK. At the end of 2010, she starred as Thuong in the movie Thiên Sứ 99, with Ngô Kiến Huy.

In May 2011, she was interviewed by the Japanese TV channel NHK to share her music career story. The single "Tìm Chọn Bình Yên" was released afterwards with two music videos, "Tìm Chọn Bình Yên" and "Đã Từng Yêu". She also starred in Ngô Kiến Huy's music video.

In early 2012, she released another album, Mãi Mãi Bên Anh, with a music video, and the single "'Điều Sẽ Đến", a song from Do Phuong which was specially written for her matching the "sexy lady" image she was achieving. At the end of 2012, she and Ngo Kien Huy released the single "Yêu Em", with two music videos. After the video was finished, both were sick for three days having been soaked by man-made rain for the scene.

Early in 2013, she released the single "Cảm Giác Yêu", written by herself. Shortly after, she was chosen as a backstage host at The Voice Vietnam.

In July 2013, the album The G-Invasion was released by her and other artists from singer Đăng Khôi's entertainment. With singers like Thanh Duy and Hương Giang, she released the music video "Tình Yêu Đau Đớn Thế".

In August 2014, she left her agency and appeared as Quynh in the movie Không Nói Được (Unspeakable), after which, she signed a contract with 6th Sense Entertainment, which is also Dong Nhi's management agency.

In 2015, she released a music viseo, "Đừng Cố Níu Kéo", as a comeback. She joined the TV show Cùng Nhau Tỏa Sáng as a member of team Tuoi Xanh, and appeared as Mat Nai in the movie Mat Nai. Later, she spent time rehearsing for the next comeback.

In May 2017, she and Ngo Kien Huy released the music video "Yêu Không Đường Lui" as a seventh anniversary. The video was filmed in Korea with travel blog style. On 
August 14, 2017, two years after the "Đừng Cố Níu Kéo" single, she came back with the music videos "Yêu Em" and "Hãy Như Lời Anh Hứa", composed by Thieu Bao Trang as a special gift. The song had a tropical style and a catchy and happy tune which is about a girl sending her love to a man, as she hopes for happiness and prays that they will be together forever.

Albums 
Strawberry's Story (2009)
Try To Up (2009)
Single No Boundaries (2010)
Single Hurry (2010)
Khong Tu Quynh Remix (2012)
Forever With You (2012)
Single Article Will Go (2012)
Single Love You (2012)
Single Feeling Of Love (2013)

Film 
Teen Princess and Tigers(2010)
 The color of love (2010) The Prophet 99 (2011)

Awards 
 Second prize drama of the City
 Hot V teen of VTM magazine in 2006
 The most impressive face generation the Web "8X Generation"
 Model of Muc Tim magazine
 Music video of the year of Zing Music Awards 2010

References

21st-century Vietnamese women singers
Vietnamese idols
1991 births
Living people
People from Ho Chi Minh City